The Bugbook Historical Microcomputer Museum  was a small display of several hundred key items from the collection of computer hobbyist David G. Larsen. The Museum was developed and maintained by the LCF Group (David & Gaynell Larsen and Dee Wallace) in Floyd, Virginia from 2008-2016.  The name of the museum comes from the Bugbooks and Blacksburg Continuing Education Books a, a series of instructional books created by the "Blacksburg Group" during the late 1970s & 80's. David was a part of the group. The museum closed in May 2016 and Larsen donated the majority of his collection to the Computer Museum of America in Roswell, Georgia.

History
The museum curator, David Larsen, collected computer artifacts and memorabilia for over forty years. He was interested in electronics at an early age and had his start in computers in 1957 with a Navy assignment at Remington Rand UNIVAC St. Paul. His entire career has involved electronics and microcomputers. This includes thirty one years as a Virginia Tech faculty member teaching instrumentation and automation. He is also an amateur radio operator and has been for six decades.

Significant collection items
The museum itself was focused on the period from 1971-1981 when personal computers were first in production. Among the items that the museum featured were:
Apple I exact operational clone on display and four original Apple-1 computers in collection shown by special request.
Mark-8
Altair 8800 low serial number #21 
Commodore 64

See also
List of computer museums

References

External links

 

Computer museums in the United States
Defunct museums in Virginia
Museums disestablished in 2016